The 1977 Tour de Suisse was the 41st edition of the Tour de Suisse cycle race and was held from 15 June to 24 June 1977. The race started in Baden and finished in Effretikon. The race was won by Michel Pollentier of the Flandria team.

General classification

References

1977
Tour de Suisse
June 1977 sports events in Europe
1977 Super Prestige Pernod